John Russell Niklos II (born, June 19, 1979) is a former American football fullback.

Early years
J.R. played high school football and track for Thomas Worthington High School where he was an All American in both Track and Football.  J.R. won the indoor track state championship in the 200 and 4x400 and his 4x400 team also won the Ohio state championship and placed second in the nation at the National Championship.  He was all state, all region and all district for Football as well as Honorable Mention All American.

College career
Safety was his first position as a collegiate athlete, at Ohio State University.  Niklos played one season for the Buckeyes and soon thereafter transferred to Western Illinois University where he was a 3 time All American Tight End.  J.R. finished his career at Western Illinois statistically as the top Tight End in W.I.U. history.

Professional career

After college, Niklos went undrafted and signed a free agent contract with the Seattle Seahawks.   
He was placed on Seattle Seahawks practice squad.  The St. Louis Rams moved J.R. to the active roster due to the retirement of former Heisman Trophy winner Eric Crouch He then was a member of the St. Louis Rams between 2002 and 2005 where Mike Martz labeled him "The Fastest Fullback In The NFL". [9] He then played a season in Germany with NFL Europa and won a World Bowl with the Frankfurt Galaxy.  Due to the cancellation of NFL Europa, Niklos returned to the United States, and signed with the Cleveland Browns. Niklos also spent time with the Oakland Raiders and was on Injured Reserve with the Kansas City Chiefs.

Post career 
Niklos is currently owner of Acceleration Sports Performance and Midwest BOOM Football. He also is the Special Teams Coordinator at College Of Dupage where he helped lead the team to win the 2021 Junior College National Championship.

References

External links
Just Sports Stats
Career transactions

1979 births
Western Illinois Leathernecks football players
Ohio State Buckeyes football players
American football fullbacks
Cleveland Browns players
Frankfurt Galaxy players
Living people
Oakland Raiders players
People from Worthington, Ohio
Seattle Seahawks players
St. Louis Rams players